Henry Hope was a merchant banker.

Henry Hope may also refer to:
Henry Hope (Isle of Man lieutenant governor), lieutenant governor of the Isle of Man from 1773 to 1775
Henry Hope (Quebec lieutenant governor) (c. 1746–1789), British Army officer and uncle of the Royal Navy officer
Henry Philip Hope (1774–1839), art collector of Hope Diamond fame
Henry Hope (Royal Navy officer) (1787–1863), nephew of the British Army officer and lieutenant governor
Henry Hope (politician) (1912–1965), Australian politician
Henry Thomas Hope (1808–1862), British MP and patron of the arts
Henry Pelham-Clinton-Hope, 9th Duke of Newcastle (1907–1988), British peer and aviator

See also

Harry Hope (disambiguation)